Chinthaka Amal Mayadunne (born 11 October 1975) is a Sri Lankan politician, former provincial councillor and Member of Parliament.

Mayadunne was born on 11 October 1975. He was a member of Uhana Divisional Council and the North Western Provincial Council. He contested the 2015 parliamentary election as one of the United People's Freedom Alliance (UPFA) electoral alliance's candidates in Puttalam District but failed to get elected after coming 6th amongst the UPFA candidates. He contested the 2020 parliamentary election as a Sri Lanka People's Freedom Alliance electoral alliance candidate in Puttalam District and was elected to the Parliament of Sri Lanka.

References

1975 births
Local authority councillors of Sri Lanka
Living people
Members of the 16th Parliament of Sri Lanka
Members of the North Western Provincial Council
Sinhalese politicians
Sri Lankan Buddhists
Sri Lanka People's Freedom Alliance politicians
Sri Lanka Podujana Peramuna politicians
United People's Freedom Alliance politicians